The 2016 CFL Draft took place on Tuesday, May 10, 2016 at 7:00 PM ET on TSN2 and RDS2. 70 players were chosen from among eligible players from Canadian Universities across the country, as well as Canadian players playing in the NCAA. The draft was expanded to eight rounds, which is the most since there were eight rounds in the 1992 CFL Draft. This draft also featured the most draft selections since 1987 when 72 players were drafted.

The entity which owns both TSN2 and RDS2 showed the first round of the draft on its cable TV platforms with subsequent rounds streamed on TSN GO online. The English language cable channel TSN2 featured host Farhan Lalji and the CFL on TSN panel including Duane Forde, Gary Lawless, Chris Schultz, and Lee Barrette who were chosen to analyze the teams' needs and picks while the French language channel RDS2 featured host Matthieu Proulx alongside analysts, Bruno Heppell, Didier Orméjuste and Pierre Vercheval.

Top prospects

Trades
In the explanations below, (D) denotes trades that took place during the draft, while (PD) indicates trades completed pre-draft.

Round one
 Hamilton  → BC (D). Hamilton traded the 5th overall selection and the 23rd overall selection in this year's draft to BC for the 3rd overall selection and the 30th overall selection in this year's draft.
 BC → Hamilton (D). BC traded the 3rd overall selection and the 30th overall selection in this year's draft to Hamilton for the 5th overall selection and the 23rd overall selection in this year's draft.

Round two
 Saskatchewan → Edmonton (PD). Saskatchewan traded this selection and Cory Watson to Edmonton for the rights to Jorgen Hus and a third-round pick in this year's draft.
 Edmonton → Winnipeg (PD). Edmonton traded this selection and Selvish Capers to Winnipeg for Chris Greaves.

Round three
 Saskatchewan → Hamilton (PD). Saskatchewan traded this selection and a third-round pick in the 2015 CFL Draft to Hamilton for Brandon Boudreaux, a fourth-round pick in this year's draft and a fourth-round pick in the 2015 CFL Draft.
 Edmonton → Saskatchewan (PD). Edmonton traded this selection and the rights to Jorgen Hus to Saskatchewan for Cory Watson and a second-round pick in this year's draft.
 Calgary → Saskatchewan (PD). Calgary traded this selection and Tyler Crapigna to Saskatchewan for Jerome Messam and a fifth-round pick in this year's draft.
 BC → Hamilton (D). BC traded the 3rd overall selection and the 30th overall selection in this year's draft to Hamilton for the 5th overall selection and the 23rd overall selection in this year's draft. 
 BC → Hamilton (D). BC traded the 21st overall selection in this year's draft to Hamilton for the 30th overall selection and the 32nd overall selection in this year's draft.

Round four
 Hamilton → Saskatchewan (PD). Hamilton traded this selection, Brandon Boudreaux, and a fourth-round pick in the 2015 CFL Draft to Saskatchewan for a third-round pick in this year's draft and a third-round pick in the 2015 CFL Draft.
 Edmonton → Hamilton (PD). Edmonton traded this selection and a conditional selection in the 2015 CFL Draft to Hamilton for Steve Myddelton.
 Saskatchewan → Toronto (PD). Saskatchewan traded this selection to Toronto for Bruce Campbell.
 Hamilton  → BC (D). Hamilton traded the 5th overall selection and the 23rd overall selection in this year's draft to BC for the 3rd overall selection and the 30th overall selection in this year's draft.
 Hamilton  → BC (D). Hamilton traded the 30th overall selection and the 32nd overall selection in this year's draft to BC for the 21st overall selection in this year's draft.

Round five
 Montreal → Saskatchewan (PD). Montreal traded this selection to Saskatchewan for Kevin Glenn.
 Saskatchewan → Calgary (PD). Saskatchewan traded this selection and Jerome Messam to Calgary for Tyler Crapigna and a third-round pick in this year's draft.
 BC → Hamilton (PD). BC traded this selection to Hamilton for Tim O'Neill.

Round six
 Hamilton → Montreal (PD). Hamilton traded this selection and a conditional seventh-round pick in the 2017 CFL Draft to Montreal for Mike Edem.
 Saskatchewan → Ottawa (PD). Saskatchewan traded this selection and a seventh-round pick in this year's draft to Ottawa for Maurice Price and a sixth-round pick in this year's draft.
 Ottawa → Saskatchewan (PD). Ottawa traded this selection and Maurice Price to Saskatchewan for a sixth-round pick and a seventh-round pick in this year's draft.

Round seven
 Saskatchewan → Ottawa (PD). Saskatchewan traded this selection and a sixth-round pick in this year's draft to Ottawa for Maurice Price and a sixth-round pick in this year's draft.

Conditional trades
 Ottawa → Saskatchewan (PD). Ottawa traded a conditional selection to Saskatchewan for the rights to Johnny Mark.

Forfeitures
 Winnipeg forfeits their first-round selection after selecting Garrett Waggoner in the 2015 Supplemental Draft.
 Calgary forfeits their seventh-round selection after selecting Brandon Tett in the 2015 Supplemental Draft.

Draft order

Round one

Round two

Round three

Round four

Round five

Round six

Round seven

Round eight

References

Canadian College Draft
2016 in Canadian football